Cymindis favieri is a species of ground beetle in the subfamily Harpalinae. It was described by Fairmaire in 1859.

References

favieri
Beetles described in 1859